Azhagiya Tamil Magan  ( Adorable Tamil son) is a 2007 Indian Tamil-language psychological action thriller film written and directed by Bharathan, written by S. K. Jeeva and produced by Swargachitra Appachan. The film stars actor Vijay in a dual role for the first time in his career as an MBA student and a money-minded, womanizing look-alike while Shriya Saran, Namitha, and N. Santhanam play in supporting roles. With cinematography by K. Balasubramaniam and editing by Anthony, the film's score and the soundtrack are composed by A. R. Rahman. The film revolves around an excelling athlete who has the ability to predict future events. With his unique ability, he identifies several tragic future events, including the attempted murder of his lover by a look-alike.

The film was released on the 8th of November 2007 and distributed worldwide by Pyramid Saimira, it became a above average success domestically. The film entered the Top ten Asian film Box office charts in Malaysia and declared a hit in Malaysia. In 2021, The film had a limited re-release in Kerala.

Plot 
Gurumoorthy aka Guru is an athlete and business management student. Abhinaya is the daughter of a business baron. They meet and fall in love.

The film goes on to show how the lovers manage to get the permission of their parents. In the meantime, a different dimension in the tale is revealed while the romantic drama is unfolding. Guru visualizes some bizarre scenes inside his mind. The scenes are disturbing; and worse, they become true in real life.

A psychiatrist confirms that it is Extra Sensory Perception power and says that the imageries visualized by Guru would actually happen sooner or later. Unfortunately Guru visualizes another scene where he stabs Abi in the stomach. Sensing that he poses a danger to his sweetheart, he runs away from her to Mumbai.

In Mumbai, he stumbles upon a person who looks like himself. This gives him a different meaning of the horrible incident visualized by him. Before catching the man, Guru gets himself into an accident. In the meantime, the new man moves to Chennai.

Stylish and carefree Prasad, the Guru look-alike, is a greedy person who does anything for money. He is a womaniser and enjoys life. He meets Dhanalakshmi during his travel to Chennai. He has sex and escapes with and from her respectively. Abinaya mistakes him for Guru and brings him to her house. Sensing his opportunity, Prasad decides to act as Guru and intends to marry the rich Abhi.

The real Guru comes back and tells everyone the truth. But no one is ready to believe him, as he is outplayed by the wicked Prasad at each and every move. Finally the truth prevails, but not before a tense battle between the two. During the battle, when Guru tries to kill Prasad, he accidentally stabs Abhi. Guru tries to take Abhi to the hospital but Prasad knocks him out and changes into Guru's clothes so he will look like Guru in front of Abhi. Abhi recovers at the hospital and thinks Prasad is Guru again. At the hospital she tells him how much she hates Prasad and how much she loves Guru. When Prasad hears this he feels guilty for what he did and tells her he is not Guru. Guru suddenly comes into the room, and Prasad leaves as a reformed man.

As Prasad walks away from the hospital, Dhanalakshmi appears saying she is pregnant and its twins. Prasad and Dhanalakshmi join together.

Cast

Production
When producer Appachan approached Vijay for the film, Vijay said that he would sign the film if the producer successfully convinces A. R. Rahman to compose music for the film. Subsequently, Appachan who had known Rahman earlier from the latter's days as a keyboard programmer, brought him on board as the composer and the project was on.

Music

The soundtrack was composed by A. R. Rahman, marking his second collaboration with Vijay after 2004's Udhaya. "Ponmagal Vandaal" is a remix of the song of the same name from Sorgam (1970).

Release
The film was released on the 8th of November 2007 and distributed worldwide by Pyramid Saimira. The film was sold by Sun TV.

Prior to its release, the film was rumored to be inspired from the American film Final Destination and that the leading actor had a supernatural power. The claims were refuted by director Bharathan. Television Premier was occurred on January 26' 2010 on the occasion of Republic day.

Reception

Box office
The film collected $1,043,064 or 8 crore at the overseas box office.

Critical response
The film was reviewed by BBC UK, mentioning the film has the right mix of romance and action. Sify stated, "The highlight here is that there are 2 Vijays - the good guy and the bad guy. Director Barathan has tried out a new format, where both the hero and the villain entertain the audiences with howlarious moments, that brings the house up. Vijay makes it work and believable as he melds an effortfully from casual song froid to utter seriousness. His terrific comic timing, his ability to mock and lampoon makes his performance absolutely hits a bulls eye. In the negative character Prasad’s role, he is the veritable scene stealer. He has dubbed impressively modulating his voice for both the characters, and the way he dances in the introductory title song is amazing. No two ways about it, Vijay is the heart and soul of ATM and rated 5/5. Ananda Vikatan rated the film 40 out of 100. IndiaGlitz stated Azhagiya Tamil Magan banks heavily on Vijay's charm and performance, Vijay has lived up to the challenge created by the huge success of Pokkiri. He looks stylish and handsome with his dual role. He lights up the screen with his dynamic performance. Director Bharathan has exploited Vijay's strengths in a dual role as well. He has provided a perfect family entertainer and rated 5/5 as well. Bollywood Life stated, "When you think about Vijay's dance moves, the first song which comes to our mind his energetic, inspiring number Ellappugazhum from ATM - Azhagiya Tamil Magan. Incidentally, the words from the song "Ellappugazhum iraivan ke" are the once uttered by Mozart of Madras AR Rahman every time he receives an award. To the tunes of Rahman, Vijay's awe-inspiring dance moves will make you stand up from your seat, pumping your fist with new found energy."

Accolades

References

External links
 

2007 films
2000s Tamil-language films
Films scored by A. R. Rahman
Indian action thriller films
Tamil-language psychological thriller films
2007 directorial debut films
2007 action thriller films
2007 psychological thriller films